The 2018 European Shotgun Championships was the 64th edition of the global shotgun competition, European Shotgun Championships, organised by the European Shooting Confederation.

Results

Men

Women

Mixed

Medal table

See also
 Shotgun
 European Shooting Confederation
 International Shooting Sport Federation

References

External links

Results book

European Shooting Championships
European Shotgun Championships